Skate or Die: Tour de Thrash is a 1991 skateboarding video game for the Game Boy that was released only in North America. It was sponsored by Santa Cruz Skateboards.

Summary
There are two possible gaming modes; one allows players to skate across a half-pipe and perform a series of skateboarding stunts. The second mode requires players to compete in global skateboarding tournaments trying to navigate through a half-pipe race in less than three minutes. Sometimes, rival skaters can get in the way of the player's performance. Concrete walls can be collided with, causing the player to lose time on his already strict time limit. While making stunts is a vital part of the "Retro Rocket Ramp" mode, racing becomes more important in the "Stale Fish Tour" mode.

References

1991 video games
Electronic Arts games
Game Boy games
Game Boy-only games
North America-exclusive video games
Skateboarding video games
Multiplayer and single-player video games
Video games scored by George Sanger
Video games developed in the United States